Dominik Kafka (born 2 February 1996) is a Czech ice hockey forward currently playing for HC Frýdek-Místek of the 1st Czech Republic Hockey League.

References

External links
 

1996 births
Living people
Competitors at the 2019 Winter Universiade
Czech ice hockey forwards
HC Frýdek-Místek players
HC Vítkovice players
HC RT Torax Poruba players
Czech expatriate ice hockey people
Expatriate ice hockey players in Hungary
Debreceni EAC (ice hockey) players
Czech expatriate sportspeople in Hungary